Wemerson Olivera, known by the stage name Wem, is a New Jersey-based American hip hop artist and music video director. Wem has been featured in XXL Magazine and is known for establishing himself in the American rap industry after being a first-generation immigrant from Brazil.

References

Year of birth missing (living people)
American hip hop musicians
Living people